The Nissan Figaro is a front-engine, front-wheel drive, two-door, 2+2, fixed-profile convertible manufactured by Nissan for model year 1991, and marketed in Japan at Nissan Cherry Stores.

A total of 20,073 Figaros were produced by Nissan in the convertible's single year of series production—all with right hand drive. There are a few examples of left hand drive conversions for those countries that have right hand traffic.

As a fixed-profile convertible, the upper side elements of the Figaro's bodywork remain fixed, while its fabric soft top retracts in conjunction with a solid panel with a defroster-equipped glass rear window—as seen in other fixed-profile convertibles, including the original 1957 Fiat 500 and the Citroën 2CV.

Because of its origins at Pike Factory, Nissan's special project group, the Figaro (along with the Nissan Pao, Be-1 and S-Cargo) are known as Nissan's "Pike cars,"  and represented a design strategy that adapted "design and marketing strategies from other industries like personal electronics."

In 2011, design critic Phil Patton, writing for the New York Times, called the Pike cars "the height of postmodernism" and "unabashedly retro, promiscuously combining elements of the Citroën 2CV, Renault 4, Mini, and Fiat 500".

Design
Nissan introduced the Figaro at the 1989 Tokyo Motor Show, using "Back to the Future" as its marketing tagline. Based on the first-generation Nissan Micra, the Figaro was manufactured at Aichi Machine Industry, a special projects group which Nissan would later call "Pike Factory", which also produced three other niche vehicles: the Be-1, Pao, and S-Cargo. Aichi had originally built independent kei cars like the Cony 360 until Nissan assumed operations in 1966, and was also the original manufacturing location for the first generation Nissan Sunny.

The Figaro can reach a top speed of 106 mph (170.59 km/h). Weight saving front fenders are thermoplastic resin.

Standard equipment included ivory leather seats with contrasting piping, air conditioning, CD player, chrome and Bakelite-style knobs, soft-feel paint on the dashboard top, chrome-trimmed speedometer with smaller inset gauges for fuel and engine temperature; and chrome-trimmed tachometer with inset clock.

Exterior paint color represented the four seasons: Topaz Mist (autumn), Emerald Green (spring), Pale Aqua (summer) and Lapis Grey (winter).

At first, 8,000 Figaros were manufactured and then an additional 12,000 to meet demand. Prospective purchasers entered a lottery to acquire a Figaro. Limited edition cars came with passenger side baskets and cup holders.

The Figaro also inspired the styling of another similar Japanese coupe, the First-Generation Daihatsu Copen, which took elements of the design, but notably with an even smaller engine (with the addition of a turbocharger) and that it was a full retractable hardtop, with the whole roof and c-pillars folding down into the boot.

In media 
Sarah Jane Smith drives a Nissan Figaro in British science fiction series The Sarah Jane Adventures.

References

External links

 

Figaro
Cars introduced in 1991
Retro-style automobiles
Front-wheel-drive vehicles
Convertibles